Hitz is a surname. Notable people with the surname include:

Alex Hitz (born 1969), American chef
David Hitz, American engineer
Franz Hitz (1828–1891), Swiss pianist and composer
Frederick Hitz (born 1939), former Inspector General of the CIA
Hans Jakob Hitz (born 1949), German slalom canoeist
Jason Hitz (born 1980), Zimbabwean cricketer
Marwin Hitz (born 1987), Swiss football goalkeeper
Ralph Hitz (1891–1940), Vienna-born American hotel manager
William Hitz (1872–1935), American federal judge